This article presents the complete oeuvre of American musician, composer and record producer Kramer, including his work as a band member and collaborating artist.

As a Solo artist

Studio albums

Collaborative albums

Live albums

Compilation albums

Shockabilly

Studio albums

Extended plays

Singles

Live albums

Compilation albums

Bongwater

Studio albums

Extended plays

Singles

Compilation albums

B.A.L.L.

Studio albums

Compilation albums

Credits

Performance credits

References

External links

Discographies of American artists
Rock music discographies
Production discographies